Steven Paul "Abbo" Abbott (born January 1960 in Luton) is an English producer, A&R executive, artist manager and concert promoter. Formerly a singer/songwriter, Abbott was lead singer of the band UK Decay from 1979 to 1983.

Early life

Abbott grew up on the Farley Hill Estate in Luton in the 1960s. He attended Luton Sixth Form College,  where in 1978 he joined local punk band The Rezistors as a guitarist.

Punk career

UK Decay
Moving to vocals and guitar, Abbott renamed The Rezistors as "UK Decay" in 1979, after a front-page headline in the Daily Mirror.
In an interview with Steve Keaton for Sounds music paper, Abbott described the band as "Goth" and has since been credited with being one of the first to use the term for the music and fashion movement.

The band toured extensively around Europe on the rock and art circuits. Having supported the Dead Kennedys on their debut UK tour, the band were invited to play with them in the US and toured for five weeks in March/April 1981, playing on bills with the fledgling West Coast scene bands like Black Flag, DOA, Circle Jerks, Subhumans, Flipper and Social Unrest.
The band were outspoken against racism and discrimination and were often targeted by right-wing political groups. They made one album, entitled For Madmen Only and five singles between 1979 and 1983, spending months in the UK Independent Charts, including the punk standard "For My Country".
Abbott split from UK Decay in 1983 and formed Furyo, an experimental four-piece band, releasing a mini-album and EP in the UK and a full-length album in Japan.

Return to UK Decay
In 2008, the band reformed to perform at a number of festivals across Europe. In 2012 they recorded a new album, New Hope for the Dead, produced by Chris Tsangarides. The band also released the Wonderful Town EP in partnership with Luton Town Football Club and Luton Foodbank, all proceeds going to the latter charity.

Record and managerial career

Big Cat Records UK, 1989–
In 1989, Abbott worked as an office-equipment delivery van driver to fund starting the record label known as Big Cat, named after a line in the Big Youth song "Lightning Flash". His first signing was Carter USM's album 101 Damnations, which spawned the singles "Sherriff Fatman" and "Rubbish".

Arc of Light Classical Recordings
Abbott started this classical label by signing John Tavener, and its debut release was the first recording of his Akathist of Thanksgiving with the Westminster Abbey Choir, James Bowman and Martin Neary.

Further recordings included a Grammy nomination of Henry Purcell's Music for the Funeral of Queen Mary, recorded at Westminster Abbey as a replica of her original funeral service on its 300th anniversary, featuring soloists Emma Kirkby and Ian Bostridge. It was Abbott's suggestion and approach to Elton John that led to Elton singing "Candle in the Wind" at Princess Diana's funeral. He also compiled and recorded the subsequent tribute record Diana, Princess of Wales – Tribute, which included new recordings by Aretha Franklin, Bryan Ferry and Peter Gabriel.

Bedlam Management 1979–2007
Bedlam Management was started with Abbott's business partner Linda Obadiah. Management clients in popular music included EMF (including their number-one US single "Unbelievable" and their album Schubert Dip, which sold in excess of four million copies), Claytown Troupe, Mercury Rev, and Heather Nova, while classical artists managed included Hayley Westenra (2003–09), Nicola Benedetti (2005–09), and Aled Jones (2004–05). During this time Abbott created and produced two groups, The Choirboys and All Angels, both of which released records on Decca Records. He also wrote and co-produced two albums for Westenra based on Japanese songs, which both broke into the top 10 album charts when released by Universal Japan.

V2 Records 1998–2002
Abbott joined Richard Branson's new V2 Records as Head of International, helping to set the company up worldwide, moving to Head of A&R North America, where he lived in America from 1999 until 2002. Associated acts during this time include Moby, The Black Crowes, RZA, The Jungle Brothers and The White Stripes.

Artist manager and promoter

Abbott's company Harmonic Artists Ltd is an artist management and concert agency for a number of artists, including Max Richter, Guy Chambers, Cerys Matthews, Lang Lang (UK and Ireland), Jules Buckley and Zara McFarlane.

Abbott is on The Advisory Board at The Arts Club in Dover Street, London. He is Cultural Ambassador for the city of Luton. Abbott promotes and co-promotes live concerts at venues such as the Royal Albert Hall and the Royal Festival Hall, Manchester's Bridgewater Hall and the Birmingham Symphony Hall.

Abbott is a trustee of Tomorrow's Warriors and of Poet in the City.

The Good Life Experience Festival, Hawarden
This festival, focusing on the food, artisan-brewed drinks, bushcraft and a diverse range of live music, was started and is owned by Abbott and his partners in 2014. The first year drew more than 2,000 people and increased to 5,000 for the 2017 festival.

Public appearances
In 2007, Abbott was a judge on the BBC Two television reality show Classical Star.

In 2011, Abbott was an on-screen mentor for the BBC Two series titled Goldie’s Band: By Royal Appointment. With the help of mentors composer Guy Chambers, jazz artist Soweto Kinch, MC/songwriter Ms Dynamite, broadcaster/singer/songwriter Cerys Matthews, and Abbott, a band of musicians with "challenges" in life work through the series towards a live performance at Buckingham Palace in front of Prince Harry and an invited audience.

Personal life
Abbott married Cerys Matthews in January 2011.

References

Living people
1960 births
British male songwriters
British post-punk musicians
English punk rock singers
English businesspeople
English male singers
English music managers
English songwriters